The Men's 200 Breaststroke at the 10th FINA World Swimming Championships (25m) was swum 17 December. 57 individuals swam in the Preliminary heats in the morning, with the top-8 finishers advancing to the Final in the evening.

At the start of the event, the existing World (WR) and Championship records (CR) were:

The following records were established during the competition:

Results

Heats

Final

References

Breaststroke 200 metre, Men's
World Short Course Swimming Championships